The Carbide & Carbon Building is a 37-story,  landmark Art Deco high rise built in 1929, located on Michigan Avenue in Chicago. It was converted to a hotel in 2004.

History
The building was designed by the Burnham Brothers (the firm launched by Daniel Burnham's sons Hubert Burnham and Daniel Burnham Jr.) as the regional office of Union Carbide and Carbon Co. It was designated a Chicago Landmark on May 9, 1996.

The building was transformed into the Hard Rock Cafe's Hard Rock Hotel Chicago from 2001 to 2004. The $106 million conversion was directed by Lucien Lagrange & Associates. The hotel began hosting guests on January 1, 2004 and after its bar and restaurant were completed, it celebrated its grand opening on April 21, 2004, The current hotel capacity is 383 guest rooms and 13 suites. The Hard Rock Hotel closed on December 1, 2017, and reopened in 2018 as the St. Jane Chicago Hotel, named for Nobel Peace Prize-winner and noted Chicagoan social activist Jane Addams. The hotel temporarily closed in early 2020, due to the COVID-19 pandemic. It was sold in October 2020 to Montage International and reopened in Spring 2021 as the Pendry Chicago Hotel, following renovations.

Description

The exterior of the building is covered in polished black granite, and the tower is dark green terra cotta with gold leaf accents. The use of stylized representations of leaves on the building's exterior was an intentional reference by the architects to the prehistoric origins of subterranean carbon deposits in the decay of ancient plants. The ground floor was specifically designed to display the products of Union Carbide and Carbon's subsidiaries. The lobby features black Belgian Marble and Art Deco bronzework trim. The exterior base is black granite with black marble and bronze trim, whereas the central shaft is clad in dark green and gold terra cotta and the greenish cap (which looks from a distance like malachite but is not) is trimmed in gold leaf.

According to popular myth of the era, Burnham Brothers supposedly designed the building to resemble a dark green champagne bottle with gold foil at the top. Beginning on November 16, 2007, the gold-leaf tower was permanently illuminated at night, which further encouraged this urban legend. The design of the building has been compared to architect Raymond Hood's American Radiator Building in New York City, which allegedly inspired this one. According to an article in the April 1930 issue of Western Architect, the high profile of the Carbide & Carbon Building project allowed the Burnham Brothers to secure a commission for the Cuneo Building, another proposed skyscraper of contrasting colors that was planned for the northeast corner of Michigan Avenue and Randolph Street in mid-1929 and was intended to be 657 feet or 60 stories tall. However, the Stock Market Crash of October 1929, followed by the Great Depression, forced cancellation of the Cuneo Building proposal along with many other architectural projects. Thus, the Carbide & Carbon Building was the practice's last major commission before the Great Depression ended, by which time the firm had become Burnham & Hammond.

The architects
Burnham Brothers was the firm of Daniel H. Jr. and Hubert Burnham, sons of prominent Chicago architect Daniel Burnham, and one of the two successor firms to his D.H. Burnham & Company. After Burnham senior died in 1912, D.H. Burnham & Co. became Graham, Burnham & Co., named after Burnham's main partner, Ernest Graham, and Burnham's two sons. When the two brothers left in 1917 to start their own firm, the remaining members of Graham, Burnham & Co. formed Graham, Anderson, Probst & White – the main successor firm, which carried on Daniel Burnham's remaining work and went on to become one of the major architectural firms in Chicago during the 1920s through the 1940s. The brothers at first confused matters by reviving the name D.H. Burnham Co. (nearly but not exactly like the original D.H. Burnham & Co.), which they maintained for 11 years until 1928, when the firm officially became Burnham Brothers. In 1933, the firm joined with C. Herrick Hammond to form Burnham & Hammond.

For all its success over nine decades, GAP&W – which had its offices in Burnham's Railway Exchange Building, where D.H. Burnham & Co. had maintained its offices – had no successor firm (it closed in 2006). The largest architectural firm in Chicago today and one of the major architectural firms worldwide – the world-renowned Skidmore, Owings & Merrill, aka SOM, which also has its headquarters in the Railway Exchange Building – is actually an offshoot of Burnham Brothers: Nathaniel A. Owings joined the practice in 1929 and left in 1934, and Louis Skidmore joined in 1930 and left in 1936. Skidmore and Owings started their own firm in 1936, and John Ogden Merrill joined them in 1939 to create SOM.

The Carbide & Carbon Building is probably the best known of all the brothers' Chicago commissions. Their other building designs include the original State of Illinois Building at 160 N. LaSalle St. (1924), the Seneca Hotel at 200 E. Chestnut St. (1926), the Bankers Building, aka the Clark-Adams Building (1927), the City-State Building (1927), the Randolph-Wells Building (1928), and the Engineering Building at 205 W. Wacker Dr. (1928), all in Chicago; and the Joliet Chamber of Commerce Clubhouse (1925), the Joliet YMCA Building (1928) and the auditorium of Joliet Township High School (now Joliet Central). Working under the temporarily revived D.H. Burnham Co. name, Burnham Brothers designed the 2,100-seat high school auditorium as part of the school's 1924 addition; the firm was also involved with the school's 1917, 1922 and 1931 additions.

In popular culture
The top of the Carbide & Carbon Building was the filming location for an opening shooting scene in the 2008 film Wanted, starring James McAvoy, Morgan Freeman and Angelina Jolie. It is also the filming location for Bruce Wayne's building / Batgirl's lair, in Gotham City, as incorporated in the Arrowverse as part of Elseworlds, a 2018 crossover storyline among the shows, which introduced Batwoman. The building also appeared in Season 10, Episode 4 of Shameless. A scaled-up version of the building features as a prominent landmark within the fictional city of Lost Heaven in the video game Mafia: Definitive Edition.

Gallery

See also 
Chicago architecture
Daniel Burnham
Graham, Anderson, Probst & White

References

External links

Chicago Landmarks: Carbide and Carbon Building
Carbide & Carbon Building on Emporis
St. Jane Chicago Hotel official website

Office buildings completed in 1929
Skyscraper office buildings in Chicago
Art Deco skyscrapers
Hotels in Chicago
Art Deco hotels
Art Deco architecture in Illinois
Chicago Landmarks
1929 establishments in Illinois